Short-track speed skating at the 1990 Asian Winter Games took place in the city of Sapporo, Japan, with ten events contested – five each for men and women. Relay events for both men and women were added in this edition of the Winter Asiad.

Medalists

Men

Women

Medal table

References
Results of the Second Winter Asian Games

 
1990 Asian Winter Games events
1990
International speed skating competitions hosted by Japan
1990 in short track speed skating